Disappeared is an album by English electronic duo Spring Heel Jack. The album was released by Thirsty Ear on 22 August 2000.

Critical reception
Keyboard wrote that Spring Heel Jack "slams together big beats and distorted industrial sampies in an all-instrumental collage that's both fresh and unpretentious." The Times called the album "an inventive exercise which sees [the band] vaulting across a dozen different genres," writing that  "[Ashley] Wales's elastic trumpet talents are a constant, occasionally complemented by guest clarinet, but it's the clatter of breakbeats that dominates."

Track listing
 "Rachel Point" (John Coxon, Ashley Wales) – 6:31
 "Mit Wut" (Coxon, Wales) – 7:06
 "Disappeared 1" (Coxon, John Surman, Wales) – 6:14
 "Bane" (Coxon, Wales) – 4:34
 "Galina" (Coxon, Wales) – 7:14
 "Trouble and Luck" (Coxon, Wales) – 5:49
 "I Undid Myself" (Coxon, Wales) – 4:25
 "Lester" (Coxon, Wales) – 1:30
 "To Die a Little" (Coxon, Wales) – 3:14
 "Disappeared 2" (Coxon, Surman, Wales) – 4:59
 "Wolfing" (Coxon, Wales) – 5:30

References

External links
 Disappeared at Metacritic

2000 albums
Spring Heel Jack albums
Thirsty Ear Recordings albums